Majlinda Kelmendi  (born 9 May 1991) is a Kosovan-Albanian former judoka and judo coach.

In 2014, Majlinda topped the IJF Women's Prestige World Ranking List. On 7 August 2016, she became the first Kosovan athlete to win a medal at the Olympic Games when she claimed gold in the women's −52 kg category at the 2016 Olympics in Rio de Janeiro. She also represented Albania at the 2012 Summer Olympics.

Early life
Majlinda Kelmendi was born on 9 May 1991 into a Kosovo Albanian family in the city of Peja, then part of the Socialist Federal Republic of Yugoslavia, present-day Kosovo. She was the cousin (aunt's daughter) of the Swedish footballer of Kosovan descent Dijar Zariqi.

Career
In 2009, Kelmendi won the gold medal at the World Junior Championships in Paris. In 2010, she came 5th at the World Junior Championships in Morocco and finished 9th in the 52 kg category at the 2010 World Judo Championships in Tokyo, Japan. She defeated Jaana Sundberg in the first round of the 2012 Olympics but then lost to Christianne Legentil in the second round.

At the 2013 World Judo Championships, Kelmendi gave Kosovo its first ever judo world title as she beat Brazil's Erika Miranda in the −52 kg gold medal match in Rio de Janeiro. The 22-year-old – the first Kosovar judoka to win a medal at the championships since Kosovo's declaration of independence in 2008 – was not a shock winner as she came to Rio de Janeiro ranked number one in her category having won the prestigious Masters event. Kelmendi retained the world title in 2014. She only lost twice in 2013 and had beaten everyone of note in her division. She did not defend her title the following year due to injury.

In February 2016, she won the gold medal at Paris Grand Slam, making her third consecutive title after winning in 2014 and 2015. Two months later, she earned a gold medal at the 2016 European Judo Championships in Kazan, Russia. At the 2016 Summer Olympics she became the first ever Kosovan athlete to win a gold medal, or any medal at all, for Kosovo at an Olympic Games. Controversy arose when reports emerged that she had declined to take an unscheduled doping control test in June in France; her trainer insists she is clean, and that she refused due to the tester having no authorisation from WADA.

Due to the resistance of International Olympic Committee and the United Nations, Kelmendi was unable to represent Kosovo at the 2012 Summer Olympics in London. Also, IOC turned down Kelmendi's request to compete as an independent athlete. Kelmendi chose to represent Albania, as the vast majority of Kosovars are ethnic Albanians.

In October 2014, the International Olympic Committee provisionally recognised the Olympic Committee of Kosovo and gave it full membership on 9 December 2014. Kosovo participated at the 2016 Summer Olympics in Rio de Janeiro, Brazil, the country's first appearance at an Olympic event. Kelmendi was Kosovo's flag bearer during the Parade of Nations of the opening ceremony in Rio. Her gold medal in those games was Kosovo's first ever Olympic medal. She is also a citizen of Albania and has an Albanian passport.

In 2021, she won one of the bronze medals in her event at the 2021 Judo World Masters held in Doha, Qatar. A month later, she won one of the bronze medals in her event at the 2021 Judo Grand Slam Tel Aviv held in Tel Aviv, Israel. She competed in the women's 52 kg event at the 2020 Summer Olympics in Tokyo, Japan.

Statistics

Medals record
Source:

2009
 World Cup − 52 kg, Prague
2010
 World Cup − 52 kg, Sofia
 European Cup − 52 kg, Sarajevo
 Grand Prix − 52 kg, Tunis
 World Cup − 52 kg, Tallinn
2011
 World Cup − 52 kg, Sofia
 Grand Prix − 52 kg, Düsseldorf
 World Cup − 52 kg, Lisbon
 World Cup − 52 kg, Rome
 World Cup − 52 kg, Minsk
 Grand Prix − 52 kg, Abu Dhabi
 Grand Prix − 52 kg, Amsterdam
2012
 European Cup − 52 kg, Prague
 World Cup − 52 kg, Rome
 World Cup − 52 kg, Istanbul
 Grand Prix − 52 kg, Abu Dhabi
2013
 Grand Slam − 52 kg, Paris
 Grand Prix − 52 kg, Düsseldorf
 Grand Prix − 52 kg, Samsun
 European Championships − 52 kg, Budapest
 IJF World Masters − 52 kg, Tyumen
 World Championships − 52 kg, Rio de Janeiro
2014
 Grand Slam − 52 kg, Paris
 Grand Prix − 52 kg, Samsun
 European Championships − 52 kg, Montpellier
 Grand Prix − 52 kg, Budapest
 World Championships − 52 kg, Chelyabinsk
 Grand Slam − 52 kg, Abu Dhabi
2015
 European Cup − 52 kg, Prague
 World Cup − 52 kg, Lisbon
 Grand Slam − 52 kg, Paris
 Grand Slam − 52 kg, Abu Dhabi
2016
 Grand Slam − 52 kg, Paris
 European Championships − 52kg, Kazan
 Grand Prix − 52 kg, Budapest
 Olympic Games − 52 kg, Rio de Janeiro
2017
 Grand Slam − 52 kg, Paris
 European Championships − 52kg, Warsaw
2018
 Grand Slam − 52 kg, Abu Dhabi
 Grand Prix − 52 kg, Tashkent
2019
 Grand Prix − 52 kg, Tel Aviv
 Grand Slam − 52 kg, Düsseldorf
 European Games − 52 kg, Minsk
 World Championships − 52 kg, Tokyo
 Grand Slam − 52 kg, Abu Dhabi
2021
 IJF World Masters − 52 kg, Doha

Notes

References

External links

 
 
 
 

1991 births
Living people
Sportspeople from Peja
World judo champions
Judoka trainers
Kosovan female judoka
Olympic judoka of Kosovo
Judoka at the 2016 Summer Olympics
Medalists at the 2016 Summer Olympics
Olympic medalists in judo
Olympic gold medalists for Kosovo
European Games medalists in judo
European Games gold medalists for Kosovo
Judoka at the 2019 European Games
Judoka at the 2020 Summer Olympics
Albanian female judoka
Olympic judoka of Albania
Judoka at the 2012 Summer Olympics